Sam Hernandez (born November 18, 1969) is a former American football defensive lineman in the Arena Football League. He is from San Jose, California, and played college football at Sonoma State University.

Hernandez played for the Charlotte Rage, Las Vegas Sting, Anaheim Piranhas, and San Jose SaberCats. In 2011, Hernandez was elected into the Arena Football Hall of Fame.

College career
Hernandez attended Sonoma State University in Rohnert Park, California, where he was a member of the football team. From 1990 to 1991, he was the most dominant defensive player in the Northern California Athletic Conference, twice winning Defensive Player of the Year and two first team All-Northern California Athletic Conference selections.

References

1968 births
Living people
American football defensive ends
American football defensive tackles
Anaheim Piranhas players
Charlotte Rage players
Las Vegas Sting players
San Jose SaberCats players
Sonoma State Cossacks football players
Players of American football from San Jose, California